

A–Z

Documentaries

Shorts

References

External links 
IMDB listing for German films made in 1935
filmportal.de listing for films made in 1935

German
Lists of German films
film